Gilău (or Gela) is a commune in Cluj County, Transylvania, Romania. It is made up of three villages: Gilău, Someșu Cald (Melegszamos) and Someșu Rece (Hidegszamos).

Demographics 
According to the census from 2002 there was a total population of 7,861 people living in this town. Of this population, 83.43% are ethnic Romanians, 9.45% are ethnic Hungarians and 7.08% ethnic Romani.

Natives
Frederic Littman

References 

Communes in Cluj County
Localities in Transylvania